Amorpha is a genus of plants in the pea family, Fabaceae. All the species are native to North America, from southern Canada, most of the United States (US), and northern Mexico. They are commonly known as false indigo. The name Amorpha means "deformed" or "without form" in Greek and was given because flowers of this genus only have one petal, unlike the usual "pea-shaped" flowers of the Faboideae subfamily. Amorpha is missing the wing and keel petals.

The desert false indigo or indigo bush (Amorpha fruticosa), is a shrub that grows from 3 m to 5 m tall. The species is considered a rare species in the US state of West Virginia and in the Canadian provinces of Manitoba and Ontario, but is considered an invasive plant in some areas of the northeastern and northwestern United States and in southeastern Canada, beyond its native range, and has also been introduced into Europe.

The lead plant (Amorpha canescens), a bushy shrub, is an important North American prairie legume. Lead plant is often associated with little bluestem (Schizachyrium scoparium), a common prairie grass. Native Americans used the dried leaves of lead plant for pipe smoking and tea.

Amorpha species are used as food plants by the larvae of some Lepidoptera species including Schinia lucens, which feeds exclusively on the genus.

Amorphol, a rotenoid bioside, can be isolated from plants of the genus Amorpha.

Species
Amorpha comprises the following species:

 Amorpha apiculata Wiggins

 Amorpha californica Torr. & A. Gray—California false indigo, mock locust
 var. californica Torr. & A. Gray
 var. napensis Jeps.
 Amorpha canescens Pursh—leadplant
 Amorpha confusa (Wilbur) S.C.K. Straub, Sorrie & Weakley
 Amorpha crenulata Rydb. (endangered)

 Amorpha fruticosa L.—desert false indigo
 Amorpha georgiana Wilbur—Georgia false indigo
 Amorpha glabra Poir.—mountain false indigo

 Amorpha herbacea Walter—clusterspike false indigo
 var. herbacea Walter
 var. floridana (Rydb.) Wilbur

 Amorpha laevigata Torr. & A. Gray—smooth false indigo

 Amorpha nana C. Fraser—dwarf false indigo
 Amorpha nitens F.E. Boynton—shining false indigo

 Amorpha ouachitensis Wilbur—Ouachita false indigo

 Amorpha paniculata Torr. & A. Gray—panicled false indigo

 Amorpha roemeriana Scheele—Roemer's false indigo
 Amorpha schwerinii C.K. Schneid.—Schwerin's false indigo

Species names with uncertain taxonomic status
The status of the following species is unresolved:

 Amorpha arborea Schkuhr
 Amorpha californica Nutt.
 Amorpha coerulea Lodd.
 Amorpha colorata Raf.
 Amorpha crocea hort. ex Lavallée
 Amorpha dealbata hort. ex Lavallée
 Amorpha discolor Raf.
 Amorpha elata Hayne
 Amorpha elatior hort. ex Lavallée
 Amorpha flexuosa Raf.
 Amorpha gaertneri K.Koch
 Amorpha gardneri K.Koch
 Amorpha glauca Raf.
 Amorpha incana Engelm.
 Amorpha laevigata Nutt.
 Amorpha lewisii Lodd. ex Loudon
 Amorpha ludoviciana hort. ex Lavallée
 Amorpha ludwigii K.Koch
 Amorpha lutea Raf.
 Amorpha macrophyla Raf.
 Amorpha marginata hort. ex Lavallée
 Amorpha mimosifolia Voss
 Amorpha nana Nutt.
 Amorpha nonperforata Schkuhr
 Amorpha ornata Wender.
 Amorpha pedalis Blanco
 Amorpha perforata Schkuhr
 Amorpha rabiae Lex.
 Amorpha retusa Raf.
 Amorpha sensitiva Voss
 Amorpha tenesseensis Schult.
 Amorpha tomentosa Raf.
 Amorpha verrucosa Raf.

Hybrids
The following hybrid has been described:
 Amorpha ×notha E.J. Palmer

References

External links

 
Fabaceae genera